The men's 500 meter at the 2017 KNSB Dutch Single Distance Championships took place in Heerenveen at the Thialf ice skating rink on Wednesday 28 December 2016. Although the tournament was held in 2016 it was  part of the 2016–2017 speed skating season. There were 20 participants.

Statistics

Result

Draw

Source:

Referee: Dina Melis. Starter: André de Vries 
Start: 19:19hr. Finish: 19:46hr.

References

Single Distance Championships
2017 Single Distance